The Guilford County Regiment was authorized on September 9, 1775 by the Third North Carolina Provincial Congress.  It was subordinate to the Salisbury District Brigade of militia.  The regiment was engaged in battles and skirmishes against the British and Cherokee during the American Revolution in North Carolina, South Carolina and Georgia between 1776 and 1781.  It was active until the end of the war.

Officers
It was first commanded by Colonel Ransom Sutherland, who was appointed by the North Carolina Provincial Congress. On April 22, 1776, Sutherland resigned, and Lt. Colonel James Martin was appointed Colonel. Colonel Martin led the Guilford Militia at the Battle of Moore's Creek Bridge, at the Battle of Guilford Courthouse and in the Cherokee Expedition of 1776. The regiment served throughout the war.

Commandants and 2nd colonels:
 Colonel Ransom Sutherland (commandant, 1775-1776)
 Colonel James Martin (commandant, 1776-1782), (Lieutenant Colonel, 1775-1776)
 Colonel Risdel Moore (2nd colonel, 1779-1780)
 Colonel John Paisly/Peasley (2nd colonel, 1780-?)
 Colonel Samuel Isaacs (2nd colonel, 1781-1783)  

Selected Captains (see Lewis for a complete list):
 Captain Arthur Forbes' Company: 1 Lieutenant, 1 Ensign, 2 Subalterns, 2 Corporals, 100 Rank & File  
 Captain James Frost's Company: Lt. Jonas Frost, Ensign Simeon Frost, 2 Subalterns, 2 Corporals, 43 Rank & File  
 Captain Samuel Sharp's Company: Lt. Joshua Young, 1 Ensign, 2 Subalterns, 2 Corporals, 80 Rank & File  
 Captain John Donald's Company: Lt. James Ross, 1 Ensign, 2 Subalterns, 2 Corporals, 55 Rank & File  
 Captain Asa Bashiers' Company: Lt. Samuel Rail, 1 Ensign, 2 Subalterns, 2 Corporals, 54 Rank & File  
 Captain William Bethel's Company: 1 Lieutenant, 1 Ensign, 2 Subalterns, 2 Corporals, 60 Rank & File  
 Captain Robert Bell's Company: Lt. Rees Porter, 1 Ensign, 2 Subalterns, 2 Corporals, 82 Rank & File  
 Captain Henry Whitesel's Company: Lt. Lodowick Clap, 1 Ensign, 2 Subalterns, 2 Corporals, 60 Rank & File  
 Captain John Nelson's Company: Lt. Josiah Gates, Ensign George Oliver, 2 Subalterns, 2 Corporals, 50 Rank & File  
 Captain George Hamilton's Company: Lt. John Duff, 1 Ensign, 2 Subalterns, 2 Corporals, 102 Rank & File  
 Captain William Wood's Company: Lt. George Pierce, Ensign James McKamie, 2 Subalterns, 2 Corporals, 46 Rank & File  
 Captain Risdon Moore's Company: Lt. John Shelley, 1 Ensign, 2 Subalterns, 2 Corporals, 81 Rank & File  
 Captain John Davis' Company: Lt. Thomas Cook, Ensign Benjamin Cook, 2 Subalterns, 2 Corporals, 64 Rank & File  
 Captain Josiah Man's Company: 1 Lieutenant, 1 Ensign, 2 Subalterns, 2 Corporals, 54 Rank & File  
 Captain James Holderness' Company: Lt. William Lewis, Ensign Turbefield Barns, 2 Subalterns, 2 Corporals, 147 Rank & File

Battles 
Elements of the Guilford County Militia participated in the following battles:
 Moore's Creek Bridge
 Cherokee Expedition of 1776
 Briar Creek
 Stono Ferry
 Siege of Charleston (1780)
 Camden
 Kings Mountain
 Cowpens
 Guilford Court House
 Siege of Ninety-Six (1781)
 Eutaw Springs

See Engagements for a more complete list of engagements and comparison with other regiments in the Salisbury District Brigade.

See also
 List of American Revolutionary War battles
 Salisbury District Brigade
 Southern Campaigns: Pension Transactions for a description of the transcription effort by Will Graves
 Southern theater of the American Revolutionary War

References

Bibliography
 
 

North Carolina militia
Guilford County, North Carolina
1775 establishments in North Carolina